The Ariane class were a sub-class of the 600 series submarines, made by France in the interwar period. Most of them served during World War II, except for Ondine, which sank on its test trial due to collision in 1928.

History
The Ariane class, or subclass, was built under the Normand-Fenaux type. They were considered the most successful of the 600 series submarines. It was made up of four submarines, Eurydice, Ariane (the lead ship), Danaé, and Ondine.

Submarines

See also 

 List of submarines of France

References

Submarine classes
French 600 Series submarines
 
Ship classes of the French Navy